Polymers for Advanced Technologies is a monthly peer-reviewed scientific journal, published since 1990 by John Wiley & Sons. It covers research on polymer science and technology.

Abstracting and indexing
The journal is abstracted and indexed in Chemical Abstracts Service, Scopus, and the Science Citation Index Expanded. According to the Journal Citation Reports, its 2020 impact factor is 3.665.

Most cited papers
The three most-cited papers are:
"Stepwise polyelectrolyte assembly on particle surfaces: a novel approach to colloid design", Volume 9, Issue 10-11, Oct-Nov 1998, Pages: 759-767, Sukhorukov GB, Donath E, Davis S, et al.
"Formation of crew-cut aggregates of various morphologies from amphiphilic block copolymers in solution", Volume 9, Issue 10-11, Oct-Nov 1998, Pages: 677-699, Zhang LF, Eisenberg A.
"Nanocomposite materials from latex and cellulose whiskers", Volume 6, Issue 5, May 1995, Pages: 351-355, Favier V, Canova GR, Cavaille JY, et al.

References

External links

Chemistry journals
Wiley (publisher) academic journals
Publications established in 1990
English-language journals
Monthly journals